Kristie Canegallo was the Deputy White House Chief of Staff for Implementation for former U.S. President Barack Obama. Her responsibilities included the execution of major projects such as health care reform. 

Previously, Canegallo served in the National Security Council from 2008 to 2012, in the Pentagon, and most recently as a senior advisor to White House Chief of Staff Denis McDonough.

A native of Springfield, Massachusetts, she holds an MA from the Johns Hopkins School of Advanced International Studies and a BA from Colgate University.

Until 2022, Canegallo was the head of Trust & Safety at Google. She is now the Chief of Staff at Department of Homeland Security

References

|-

Living people
Obama administration personnel
White House Deputy Chiefs of Staff
Women government officials
Year of birth missing (living people)